The Kansas Shrine Bowl is an annual football game for Kansas for high school seniors, organized by the Kansas Shrine Bowl, composing of members from the eastern and western sides of the state. The game is held on a college campus in Kansas, which gets bid out every year.

History
Since 1974, the Kansas Shrine Bowl established the East vs. West high school football game in Kansas. Cities in which the Shrine Bowl has been played in include Hays, Lawrence, Emporia, Manhattan, Topeka, Wichita, and Pittsburg.

Shrine Bowl week
Football participants in the Kansas Shrine Bowl football game report for camp eight days before the game, with West team reporting on the west side of the state and the East team reporting on the East side of the state. The East team practices at Francis G. Welch Stadium at Emporia State University, in Emporia, and the West team practices on the Kansas State University Polytechnic Campus in Salina.

The results are below:

The 2020 Kansas Shrine Bowl was to be held on Saturday, July 18, 2020 in Topeka, at Yager Stadium, however due to the COVID-19 pandemic, Washburn announced it wouldn’t accept outside events on campus. The Shrine Bowl announced it’d look for an alternate site.

Events

Kansas Masonic All-State Marching Band 
Beginning in 1984, Kansas Masonic All-State Marching Band is a week-long camp that the Tuesday through Saturday of Shrine Bowl Week, and performs during the banquet, Shrine Bowl parade, and the Shrine Bowl game. In 2019, the Kansas Shrine Bowl took over the camp.

The camp is held wherever the football game is being played at that year, and the camp makes up anywhere from 180 to 250 of high school musicians. Local masonic lodges and shrine temples sponsor the campers. The Kansas Masonic Foundation, who’s majority of donors are Kansas freemasons, was in charge of the camp from 1984 until 2019 when they turned it over to the Kansas Shrine Bowl.

All-Star Cheer Camp 
The Kansas Shrine Bowl All-Star Cheer Camp is held during the Wednesday through Saturday of Shrine Bowl week. The clinic consists of males and females from Kansas high schools.

References

External links
 

High school football games in the United States